The 2017 season is Washington Spirit's fifth season, competing in the National Women's Soccer League, the top division of women's soccer in the United States.

Review
In the aftermath of finishing 2016 runners-up, the Spirit saw a series of key departures including captain Ali Krieger (traded to Orlando Pride), Christine Nairn and Diana Matheson (both traded to Seattle Reign), and Crystal Dunn leaving for Chelsea, while retaining her contracting rights. In addition to the departures, key injuries to Joanna Lohman, Francisca Ordega, and goalkeeper Kelsey Wys limited the Spirit's playing options.

Unable to adequately replace these players, the Spirit struggled to compete throughout the 2017 season ultimately finishing last (10th) for the first time since the inaugural season. However, building for the future, Gabarra was able to recruit U.S. national team prospect, Mallory Pugh midseason. Pugh would go on to lead the team in scoring, registering 6 goals in 16 games.

Club

Roster
The first-team roster of Washington Spirit.

 (FP)

 (FP)

 (FP)

 (FP) = Federation player

Team management 

Source:

Competitions

Preseason 
On February 2, the Washington Spirit announced its preseason schedule.

Regular season

Regular-season standings

Results summary

Results by round

Postseason playoff
The Spirit struggled to gain any momentum during the 2017 season and were the first team to be eliminated from playoff contention after a home loss to the Chicago Red Stars on August 26 (Week 19).

Squad statistics
Squad statistics are of regular season only

Appearances and goals 

|-
|colspan="8"|Defenders:
|-

|-
|colspan="8"|Midfielders:
|-

|-
|colspan="8"|Forwards:
|-

|}

Italics indicates player left team midway through season.

Goalkeeper Stats 
Last updated: October 1, 2017

Transfers

In

Out

Honors and awards

NWSL Team of the Month

NWSL Weekly Awards

NWSL Player of the Week

NWSL Save of the Week

See also
 2017 National Women's Soccer League season

References 

Match reports (preseason)

Match reports (regular season)

Notes

External links 
 

Washington Spirit seasons
Washington Spirit
Washington Spirit
2017 in sports in Maryland